Rehli is a city and a municipality in Sagar district in the Indian state of Madhya Pradesh.

Geography
It has an average elevation of 390 meters (1,279 feet).

Demographics
 India census, Rehli had a population of 25,913. Males constitute 53% of the population and females 47%. Rehli has an average literacy rate of 75%, higher than the national average of 59.5%: male literacy is 73%, and female literacy is 57%. In Rehli, 16% of the population is under 6 years of age.

Place of Interest 
1. Rangir Devi temple 

2. Tikitoriya temple 

3. Azad fort 

4. Sun temple (1100 years old) 

5. Sonar river 

6. Nauradehi wild life sanctuary

Nature 
Atishay kshetra Patnaganj ji, Shri Dev Pandrinath Temple located in pandalpur Maratha Kalin temple, Shri Sonbhadra river (which is called Sunar river by local people), dakshin Mukhi kile wale Dada Hanuman temple, bhuteshwar dham world famous and most important citizen of Rehli 
Nauradehi protected forest and sanctuary]] is about 25 km away from Rehli. The Nauradehi Wildlife Sanctuary was established in 1975. It is covering about 1,197 km2 (462 sq mi).

Temples 
 Atishay kshetra Patnaganj ji
 Pandharinath Vitthal Temple, Rehli
 Janki Raman Temple, Rehli
 Sun Temple Rehli 
 Tikitoriya Mata Temple, Rehli
 Harsiddhi Mata Temple, Rehli
 Bade Mandir, Rehli
 Ganesh Mandir, Rehli
 Khaki baba mandir, Rehli
 Jain mandir, Rehli
 Devaliya temple, Rehli
 Old Jain Temple, Rehli
 Rameshwar Shiv Temple, Rehli
 Jhadi lord Hanuman temple Rehli

Private Schools 

Sagar, Madhya Pradesh
Cities and towns in Sagar district

References